If Only for a Moment is the second and final album by Blossom Toes, released in 1969 on Marmalade Records. The album was reissued in 2007 by Sunbeam Records along with bonus tracks.

Track listing

Personnel
 Jim Cregan – lead and rhythm guitars, lead vocals (3, 6, 8)
 Brian Godding – lead and rhythm guitars, lead vocals (2, 4, 5), organ, piano
 "Big" Brian Belshaw – bass, lead vocals (1, 7)
 Barry Reeves – drums (all but 1), percussion, congas (1)
 John "Poli" Palmer – drums (1)
 Shawn Phillips - 12-string acoustic guitar (7), sitar (7)
 Giorgio Gomelsky - backing vocals (4)
 Paragon Publicity - design (sleeve design)
 Blossom Toes, Giorgio Gomelsky - producer
 Reggie King - producer (assistant)

References

External links
Sunbeam Records info

1969 albums
Marmalade Records albums
Blossom Toes albums
Albums produced by Giorgio Gomelsky
Acid rock albums